The Newnan Times-Herald, locally known as The Times-Herald, is a newspaper published in Newnan, Georgia. 

The paper was founded in 1865, which makes it the oldest news organization in Newnan and Coweta County, Georgia. It is a local newspaper and official legal organ for the community located about 30 miles south of Atlanta. On July 22, 1972, the Newnan Times-Herald received the National Newspaper Association award for "excellence in typography".

References

External links
 Official site

Newspapers published in Georgia (U.S. state)
Coweta County, Georgia